Claes Håkan Sörman (born 17 February 1952) is a Swedish civil servant who served as Governor of Jönköping County from 1 October 2016 to 30 September 2017. He previously served as CEO of the Swedish Association of Local Authorities and Regions from 2004 to 2016 and before that as chief director of Södertälje Municipality from 1991 to 2003.

References

External links 
Länsstyrelsen: Landshövdingens biografi

Living people
1952 births
Swedish civil servants
Swedish chief executives
Politicians from Stockholm
Independent politicians in Sweden
Stockholm School of Economics alumni